The Old Chiangmai–Bangkok Sign Language family is a language family of two related sign languages: Old Chiangmai Sign Language and Old Bangkok Sign Language.  Woodward (2003) found that they were 65% cognate, indicating that the two languages are related, possibly due to migration between Chiangmai and Bangkok. There appear to be connections to sign languages of Vietnam (especially to Hai Phong Sign Language), and possibly Laotian sign languages, but the nature of these connections (whether areal or genetic) has not been determined. Village sign languages of Thailand, such as Ban Khor Sign Language, are unrelated.

References 

Sign languages
Sign language families
Languages of Thailand